Charles Bellinger Tate Stewart (February 6, 1806 – July 1, 1885) was an American-born pharmacist, doctor, and political leader in the Republic of Texas. He was born in Charleston, South Carolina, but moved to Texas in 1830. Stewart was a delegate from the Municipality of Austin to the Convention of 1836 where he signed the Texas Declaration of Independence from Mexico. He was a member of the committee that drafted the Constitution of the Republic of Texas. On March 8, 1836, two days after The Alamo fell, Stewart absented himself from the Convention for a few days to get married. On March 11, 1836, he married Julia Shepperd in the Lake Creek Settlement. Stewart returned to the Convention on March 16, 1836 and signed the Constitution of the Republic of Texas on March 17, 1836. He moved to Montgomery, Texas in 1837 and later attended the state constitutional convention of 1845. He represented Montgomery County in the Texas House of Representatives.

Some have claimed that Stewart is either the designer of the flag or drew the image used by the Third Congress when enacting the legislation adopting the flag. "Accompanying the original Act ... is a drawing by Peter Krag of the national flag and seal ... although in the original President Lamar's approval and signature are at the top and upside down[.]" However, Stewart's drawing "looks suspiciously like a tracing of the Peter Krag art, including the upside down signature of President Lamar."

On April 21, 2011, a bust of Dr. Charles B. Stewart was unveiled at the ceremony dedicating the Lone Star Monument and Historical Flag Park in Conroe, Montgomery County, Texas.

References

External links

Charles B. Stewart in the Handbook of Texas

''Charles B. Stewart Bust'.

1806 births
1885 deaths
Members of the Texas House of Representatives
19th-century American politicians
People from Montgomery, Texas
Signers of the Texas Declaration of Independence